Camilla Elizabeth Long (born 18 June 1978) is a British newspaper columnist with The Times and The Sunday Times. Long is associate editor of the News Review and a columnist for Style magazine.

Family
Camilla Long is the daughter of Richard Pelham Long and Roslyn Vera Britton, a daughter of Captain Gordon Britton RN, who were married in 1973. She has a younger sister, Zoe. Their father’s mother, Marjorie Pelham-Clinton (1910–2005), was a granddaughter of Lord Charles Clinton, a younger son of Henry Pelham-Clinton, 4th Duke of Newcastle. Their grandmother was a first cousin of the 10th Duke, who died in 1988.

Life
Long was educated at Oxford High School and Corpus Christi College, Oxford, 

She was awarded the 2010 and 2016 British Press Awards "Interviewer of the Year (broadsheet)" prize.

In January 2012, Long interviewed the actor Michael Fassbender. Her opening question referred to the large size of the actor's penis ("That's kind of you to say", he replied). A section of Long's article was read to Fassbender in a subsequent interview for GQ magazine, including Long's statement that she was "quite certain that [Fassbender] would willingly show me his penis, given slightly different circumstances and a bucket of champagne," prompting Fassbender to respond that "I don't think I would touch her with a barge pole!"

In 2013 she won the Hatchet Job of the Year award for a piece on Rachel Cusk's divorce memoir Aftermath: On Marriage and Separation published in March 2012; Long had previously been nominated the year before. 
In July 2013 Long succeeded Cosmo Landesman as film critic for The Sunday Times.

In March 2015 Long received criticism for referring to Thanet as "a small nodule of erupted spleen at the eastern edge of England." In April 2015 Long appeared on the BBC's Have I Got News for You and was asked to justify such defamatory comments about South Thanet, the constituency where Nigel Farage, then UKIP leader, was standing for election. UKIP registered a complaint with Kent Police but no further action was taken.

In February 2017, she received criticism, mainly on Twitter, for writing, in a review for The Times that the film Moonlight's "story has been told countless times, against countless backdrops", and that the film is not "relevant" to a predominantly "straight, white, middle class" audience. She was accused of being homophobic and racist, although the review was defended as more a "waspish" response to other, highly congratulatory reviews.

See also
Duke of Newcastle

References

External links
 
 
 

1978 births
Living people
Writers from Winchester
The Times journalists
People educated at Oxford High School, England
Alumni of Corpus Christi College, Oxford
English columnists
British newspaper journalists
The Sunday Times people
English film critics
British women film critics
British television personalities